Capoeta barroisi, also known as the Orontes scraper or Tigris barb, is a species of freshwater cyprinid fish from the Near East.  This species is up to 20 cm long an has sides with brownish spots irregularly arranged in the upper half of the body.

Its distribution was previously thought to comprise the Tigris-Euphrates basin and extend to Iran.  More recently, this species is thought to be restricted to a small region of the Orontes River basin in Turkey and Syria, and it is now considered endangered.

References 

Barroisi
Taxa named by Louis Charles Émile Lortet
Fish described in 1894